Topologically close pack (TCP) phases, also known as Frank-Kasper (FK) phases, are one of the largest groups of intermetallic compounds, known for their complex crystallographic structure and physical properties. Owing to their combination of periodic and aperiodic structure, some TCP phases belong to the class of quasicrystals. Applications of TCP phases as high-temperature structural and superconducting materials have been highlighted; however, they have not yet been sufficiently investigated for details of their physical properties. Also, their complex and often non-stoichiometric structure makes them good subjects for theoretical calculations.

History
In 1958, Frederick C. Frank and John S. Kasper, in their original work investigating many complex alloy structures, showed that non-icosahedral environments form an open-end network which they called the major skeleton, and is now identified as the declination locus. They came up with the methodology to pack asymmetric icosahedra into crystals using other polyhedra with larger coordination numbers. These coordination polyhedra were constructed to maintain topological close packing (TCP).

Unit-cell geometries classification
Based on the tetrahedral units, FK crystallographic structures are classified into low and high polyhedral groups denoted by their coordination numbers (CN) referring to the number of atom centering the polyhedron.
Some atoms have an icosahedral structure with low coordination, labeled CN12. Some others have higher coordination numbers of 14, 15 and 16, labeled CN14, CN15, and CN16, respectively. These atoms with higher coordination numbers form uninterrupted networks connected along the directions where the five-fold icosahedral symmetry is replaced by six-fold local symmetry. The sites of 12-coordination are called minor sites and those with more than 12-fold coordination are major sites.

Classic FK phases
The most common members of a FK-phases family are: A15, Laves phases, σ, μ, M, P, and R.

A15 phases

A15 phases are intermetallic alloys with an average coordination number (ACN) of 13.5 and eight A3B stoichiometry atoms per unit cell where two B atoms are surrounded by CN12 polyhedral (icosahedra), and six A atoms are surrounded by CN14 polyhedral. Nb3Ge is a superconductor with A15 structure.

Laves phases

The three Laves phases are intermetallic compounds composed of CN12 and CN16 polyhedra with AB2 stoichiometry, commonly seen in binary metal systems like MgZn2. Due to the small solubility of AB2 structures, Laves phases are almost line compounds, though sometimes they can have a wide homogeneity region.

σ, μ, M, P, and R phases
The sigma (σ) phase is an intermetallic compound known as the one without definite stoichiometric composition and formed at the electron/atom ratio range of 6.2 to 7. It has a primitive tetragonal unit cell with 30 atoms. CrFe is a typical alloy crystallizing in the σ phase at the equiatomic composition. With physical properties adjustable based on its structural components, or its chemical composition provided a given structure.

The μ phase has an ideal A6B7 stoichiometry, with its prototype W6Fe7, containing rhombohedral cell with 13 atoms. While many other Frank-Kasper alloy types have been identified, more continue to be found. The alloy Nb10Ni9Al3 is the prototype for the M phase. It has orthorhombic space group with 52 atoms per unit cell. The alloy Cr9Mo21Ni20 is the prototype for the P-phase. It has a primitive orthorhombic cell with 56 atoms. The alloy Co5Cr2Mo3 is the prototype for the R-phase which belongs to the rhombohedral space group with 53 atoms per cell.

Applications
FK phase materials have been pointed out for their high-temperature structure and as superconducting materials. Their complex and often non-stoichiometric structure makes them good subjects for theoretical calculations.
A15, Laves and σ are the most applicable FK structures with interesting fundamental properties. The A15 compounds are forming important intermetallic superconductor with major applications in materials used in wires for superconducting such as: Nb3Sn, Nb3Zr, and Nb3Ti. A majority of superconducting magnets are constructed out of Nb3Ti alloy.
Small extents of σ phase considerably decreases the flexibility and impairment in erosion resistance. While addition of refractory elements like W, Mo, or Re to FK phases helps to enhance the thermal properties in such alloys as steels or nickel-based superalloys, it increases the risk of unwanted precipitation in intermetallic compounds.

See also
 Complex metallic alloys

References

 
Crystal structure types